Human rights in Cameroon are addressed in the constitution. However, the 2009 Human Rights Report by the United States Department of State noted concerns in regard to election irregularities, security forces torture and arbitrary arrests.

Issues
A 2002 report by the UK charity Freedom from Torture said that "The prevalence of torture in Cameroon was such as to warrant a country visit from the United Nations Special Rapporteur on Torture in 1999. He described the use of torture in Cameroon as 'widespread and systematic.'"

In its 2012 Annual Review, Freedom from Torture stated that they had received 33 referrals for torture survivors from Cameroon for clinical treatment or other services.

Amnesty International reported concerns about violence by security forces. In 2009, around 100 civilians were killed during demonstrations.

In April 2010, Germain Cyrille Ngota Ngota, the editor of the Cameroun Express, died in custody at Kondengui Central Prison. He had been jailed pending trial in February 2010 along with the editors of two other newspapers, for the alleged "joint forgery" of the signature of a presidential official. One of the editors said that the document in question had merely been attached to an interview request, whilst the journalist who had originated the document was on the run. "The Federation of African Journalists after visiting the country described Cameroon in May 2010 as 'one of the worst jailers of journalists in Africa'."

As of 2020, Cameroon "currently prosecutes consensual same sex conduct more aggressively than almost any country in the world".

On 27 June 2022, the Human Rights Watch reported that the armed separatist fighters killed and injured people, raped a girl, and committed other grave human rights abuses across Cameroon’s Anglophone regions. The separatists also burned schools, attacked universities, and kidnapped up to 82 people, with no apparent fear of being held to account by either their own leaders or Cameroonian law enforcement.

Historical situation
The following table gives Cameroon's ratings since 1972 in the Freedom in the World reports, published annually by Freedom House. A score of 1 is "most free" and 7 is "least free".

International treaties
Cameroon's stances on international human rights treaties are as follows:

See also 

Freedom of religion in Cameroon
Human trafficking in Cameroon
Internet censorship and surveillance in Cameroon
LGBT rights in Cameroon

Notes 
1.Note that the "Year" signifies the "Year covered". Therefore the information for the year marked 2008 is from the report published in 2009, and so on.
2.As of January 1.
3.The 1982 report covers the year 1981 and the first half of 1982, and the following 1984 report covers the second half of 1982 and the whole of 1983. In the interest of simplicity, these two aberrant "year and a half" reports have been split into three year-long reports through interpolation.

References

External links
 2012 Annual Report, by Amnesty International
 Freedom in the World 2011 Report, by Freedom House